Shirley Dery-Batlik (born November 17, 1961, in White Plains, New York) is an American sprint canoer who competed in the mid to late 1980s. Competing in two Summer Olympics, she earned her best finish of fourth in the K-4 500 m event at Los Angeles in 1984.

References
Sports-Reference.com profile

1961 births
American female canoeists
Canoeists at the 1984 Summer Olympics
Canoeists at the 1988 Summer Olympics
Living people
Olympic canoeists of the United States
21st-century American women